George Hardy (born June 8, 1925) is an American retired pilot and military officer. In World War II Hardy served with the Tuskegee Airmen and flew 21 combat missions. In the Korean War he flew 45 combat mission as the pilot of a bomber. In the Vietnam War Hardy flew 70 combat missions piloting an AC-119K gunship.

Early life
Hardy's parents names were Edward Hardy and Alma Vargas. He was exposed to racism and segregation growing up in Philadelphia, Pennsylvania. He graduated high school in 1942 and wanted to join the military because his older brother had joined the U.S. Navy in 1941. When he joined the Army Air Corps in 1943 the U.S. military was segregated. Hardy faced discrimination from commanders in the Army. After WWII (1947) Hardy went to school at New York University School of Engineering and Science until 1948. Hardy wanted to be an Engineer, he did not plan to make a career in the Air Force.

Education
Walter George Smith School
South Philadelphia High School
Bachelor of Science Degree – Electrical Engineering
Master of Science Degree – Systems Engineering-Reliability – U.S. Air Force Institute of Technology
Honorary Doctorate of Public Service from Tuskegee University.

Military service

World War II

In 1943 when Hardy was 17, he joined the Army Air Corps that same year he began training to fly at the Tuskegee Air Field late. He was deployed to Keesler Army Air Field in Biloxi, Mississippi for basic training. He graduated in 1944 as a second Lieutenant in the United States Army. He was qualified to fly single-engine planes and sent to Walterboro Army Air Field in South Caroline to train for combat. He completed his combat training in 1945 and was then sent to Italy. Hardy became one of only 350 Tuskegee Airmen who were deployed overseas. He flew 21 combat missions over Germany in 1945. The majority of his missions he escorted bombers to their targets. After the war, Hardy went back to Tuskegee to train pilots.

Korean War
Hardy was recalled in 1948 and sent to Keesler Air Force Base in Mississippi. He was sent to Guam with the 19th Bomb Group. He then was sent to Kadena Air Base, Okinawa: he flew a B-29 and  piloted 45 combat missions over Korea. One senior officer, then-Lt Col Fred W. Miller, disliked Hardy because of his race and he removed him from a B-29 mission. That B-29 was shot down in North Korean airspace. 
 On a later assignment, Hardy would report to Miller who have experienced a complete turnaround; Miller would regard Hardy as one of his best commanders.

Vietnam War
Hardy flew 70 missions piloting a C-119 gunship in the Vietnam War. He flew missions at night using infrared to destroy North Vietnamese supply routes and convoys in Laos and Cambodia.

Honors and awards

The Air Medal 
Commendation Medal with one Oak Leaf Cluster. 
Congressional Gold Medal (2007)
Distinguished Flying Cross with Valor
Florida Veterans Hall of Fame
11 Oak Leaf Clusters
Tuskegee University - Honorary Doctorate Degree of Public Service (2006)

After service
Hardy was one of 188 Tuskegee airmen who attended President Barack Obama’s first inauguration. He now travels the country telling the story of the Tuskegee Airmen and speaking about segregation.

Hardy, along with 1949 Top Gun winners James H. Harvey and Harry Stewart, Jr., are among the last surviving members of the Tuskegee Airmen.

See also 

 Executive Order 9981
 List of Tuskegee Airmen
 List of Tuskegee Airmen Cadet Pilot Graduation Classes
 Military history of African Americans

References

Notes

External links
 Fly (2009 play about the 332d Fighter Group)
George Hardy Interview
George Hardy in television interview prior to the 2019 EAA AirVenture Oshkosh
Tuskegee Airmen at Tuskegee University
 Tuskegee Airmen Archives at the University of California, Riverside Libraries.
 Tuskegee Airmen, Inc.
 Tuskegee Airmen National Historic Site (U.S. National Park Service) 
 Tuskegee Airmen National Museum

1925 births
Living people
United States Army Air Forces officers
People from Tuskegee, Alabama
Tuskegee Airmen
Tuskegee University alumni
Military personnel from Tuskegee, Alabama
People from Philadelphia
Congressional Gold Medal recipients
United States Army Air Forces pilots of World War II
United States Air Force colonels
United States Air Force personnel of the Korean War
American Korean War pilots
United States Air Force personnel of the Vietnam War
American Vietnam War pilots
21st-century African-American people